Modern Wonder  was a largely factual magazine aimed at boys and young men. It had many articles and pictures on science, engineering and warfare etc. In some of the magazines, the Flash Gordon comic strip is printed in colour on the back cover. Issues were always 16 pages in length, with the covers and inside two pages printed in colour. The magazine was printed in Great Britain by Odhams Press. The magazine was in a tabloid format, approximate dimensions 36 cm x 27 cm.

The magazine (cost twopence, every Wednesday) began publication in May 1937 under the title Modern Wonder, and went through a few name changes, becoming Modern Wonders in December 1939 and Modern World from March 1940 until the magazine stopped in March 1941, possibly due to wartime paper shortages in England.

References

External links
http://www.locusmag.com/index/chklst/mg0606.htm
BRITISH JUVENILE STORY PAPERS AND POCKET LIBRARIES INDEX

1937 establishments in the United Kingdom
1941 disestablishments in the United Kingdom
Children's magazines published in the United Kingdom
Monthly magazines published in the United Kingdom
Defunct magazines published in the United Kingdom
Magazines established in 1937
Magazines disestablished in 1941